Kevin J. Williams (born November 28, 1961) is a former American football cornerback in the National Football League for the Washington Redskins and Buffalo Bills.  He played college football at Iowa State University.

External links
 

1961 births
Living people
American football cornerbacks
Washington Redskins players
Buffalo Bills players
Players of American football from San Diego
Iowa State Cyclones football players